This is an incomplete alphabetical list of constituency election results to the 38th Parliament of the United Kingdom at the 1945 general election, held in July 1945.

Notes
Change in % vote and swing is calculated between the winner and second place and their respective performances at the 1935 election. A plus denotes a swing to the winner and a minus against the winner.

England

ignores by-election

ignores by-election in 1942

ignores by-election

ignores by-election in 1943

Scotland

ignores the by-election of 1944

ignores the by-election of April 1945

Wales

ignores the by-election of May 1945

ignores the by-election of May 1945

Universities

 ignores the by-election of 1943

References

1945
1945 United Kingdom general election